Riverstage is an outdoor entertainment venue in Brisbane, Australia. The venue occupies a 2 ha site within the City Botanic Gardens and has a capacity of 9,500. The Brisbane Festival makes regularly use of the venue.  Riverstage regularly features local, national and international concerts, including large-scale music concerts, as well as family and community events.

Concert goers often bring a blanket to sit on. When the site reaches full capacity a live screening area adjacent to the Riverstage may be used.

History

Riverstage was officially opened on 7 September 1989 by Lord Mayor of Brisbane, Sallyanne Atkinson. It was inspired by the temporary Riverstage used for World Expo '88 a year earlier. The venue formerly hosted the touring Soundwave festival; having its first show there in 2007 and returning in 2008. Brisbane band Powderfinger performed their final show at the venue in November 2010.

Some of the most notable performances at Riverstage is the annual Carols by Candlelight event held every December and Daft Punk's Alive 2006-2007 Tour which they performed in December 2007. In 2011, a Queensland Relief Concert was held in which the Foo Fighters played to a sold-out crowd.  The benefit concert was held in aid of victims of the 2010–2011 Queensland floods.  Gigantour used the stage on multiple occasions.

See also
 List of contemporary amphitheaters
 List of music venues
 Popular entertainment in Brisbane
 Venues of the 2032 Summer Olympics and Paralympics

References

External links

Official website

Tourist attractions in Brisbane
Buildings and structures in Brisbane
Music venues in Australia
Brisbane central business district
1989 establishments in Australia
Venues of the 2032 Summer Olympics and Paralympics